Jonas Gaffud is a Filipino author, talent manager, pageant mentor, and marketing executive. He is the co-founder of Aces and Queens, a boot camp for beauty pageant candidates, and owner of the modeling agency Mercator Artist and Model Management.

Career

Aces and Queens 
He co-founded Aces and Queens in 2001 and held practices in the faculty center of University of the Philippines Diliman. He trained and assisted the campaigns of Pia Wurtzbach (Miss Universe 2015), Megan Young (Miss World 2013) and Kylie Verzosa (Miss International 2016), and had mentored over 30 beauty queens. Janine Tugonon (Miss Universe 2012 1st runner-up), Shamcey Supsup (Miss Universe 2011 3rd runner-up) and Venus Raj (Miss Universe 2010 4th runner-up) were discovered by him. Raj later on disclosed that her signature "pilapil" walk was taught by him and that she learned it during her time in the camp.

He launched "The Crown: Your Essential to Becoming a Beauty Queen" on August 18, 2017, a book that contained history of the camp, brief information of winners who underwent its training programs and pageant guides. 

On April 1, 2019, Gaffud left Aces and Queens after 18 years, explaining the decision on his Facebook page thus, "As much as I would love to continue training girls as head of Aces and Queens, I believe it is time for me to leave the group to pursue other endeavors." He announced three days later that he was chosen as the creative and events director of Miss Universe Philippines brand, and said that it was the reason he quit from the camp that he founded.

He responded to criticism for training Miss Universe Indonesia Kezia Warouw, which was reportedly perceived as "betrayal," saying that it was a "pep talk" and as a way to thank co-mentor Albert Kurniawan, an Indonesian.

Mercator Artist and Model Management 
He is also the co-founder of Mercator Artist and Model Management, a modeling agency. The company was established in 2004. According to Rappler, it was responsible in introducing Brazilians into the local modeling circuit.

References 

21st-century Filipino people
Filipino male writers
Beauty pageant people
Year of birth missing (living people)
Living people